The Connecticut Western Reserve was a portion of land claimed by the Colony of Connecticut and later by the state of Connecticut in what is now mostly the northeastern region of Ohio. The Reserve had been granted to the Colony under the terms of its charter by King Charles II.

Connecticut relinquished its claim to some of its western lands to the United States in 1786 following the American Revolutionary War and preceding the 1787 establishment of the Northwest Territory. Despite ceding sovereignty to the United States, Connecticut retained ownership of the eastern portion of its cession, south of Lake Erie. It sold much of this "Western Reserve" to a group of speculators who operated as the Connecticut Land Company; they sold it in portions for development by new settlers. The phrase Western Reserve is preserved in numerous institutional names in Ohio, such as Western Reserve Academy, Case Western Reserve University, and Western Reserve Hospital.

In the 19th century, the Western Reserve "was probably the most intensely antislavery section of the country". John Brown Jr. called it, in 1859, "the New England of the West".

Location
The Reserve encompassed all of the following Ohio counties: Ashtabula, Cuyahoga, Erie and Huron (see Firelands), Geauga, Lake, Lorain, Medina, Portage, Trumbull; and portions of Ashland, Mahoning, Ottawa, Summit, and Wayne.

History

Prior to the arrival of European colonizers, the land surrounding the southern shore of Lake Erie was inhabited by the Erie people. At the close of a war against the Iroquois from 1654 to 1656, the Erie were almost completely exterminated. Their towns were destroyed, and any survivors were assimilated into neighboring tribes, mainly the Seneca.

After the American Revolutionary War, Connecticut was forced by the federal government to surrender the Pennsylvania portion (Westmoreland County) of its "sea-to-sea grant" following the Pennamite–Yankee Wars. Nevertheless, the state held fast to its claim on the lands between the 41st and 42nd-and-2-minutes parallels that lay west of the Pennsylvania state border.

The claim beyond Ohio included parts of Michigan, Indiana, Illinois, Iowa, Nebraska, Wyoming, Utah, Nevada, and California. The eastern boundary of the reserve follows a true meridian along Ellicott's Line, the boundary with Pennsylvania. The western boundary veers more than four degrees from a meridian to maintain the 120-mile width, due to convergence.

Connecticut gave up western land claims following the American Revolutionary War in exchange for federal assumption of its debt, as did several other states. From these concessions, the Articles of Confederation government organized the Northwest Territory (formally known as the "Territory Northwest of the River Ohio"). The deed of cession was issued on September 13, 1786. As population increased in portions of the Northwest Territory, new states were organized and admitted to the Union in the early 19th century.

Connecticut retained  in Ohio, which became known as the "Western Reserve". The state sold the Western Reserve to the Connecticut Land Company in 1796 (or possibly 12 August, 2 September, or 5 September 1795) for $1,200,000. The Land Company were a group of investors who were mostly from Suffield, Connecticut. The initial eight men in the group (or possibly seven or 35) planned to divide the land into homestead plots and sell it to settlers from the east.

But the Indian titles to the Reserve had not been extinguished. Clear title was obtained east of the Cuyahoga River by the Greenville Treaty in 1795 and west of the river in the Treaty of Fort Industry in 1805. The western end of the reserve included the Firelands or "Sufferers' Lands,"  reserved for residents of several New England towns which had been destroyed by British-set fires during the Revolutionary War.

The next year, the Land Company sent surveyors led by Moses Cleaveland to the Reserve to divide the land into square townships,  on each side (. Cleaveland's team also founded the city of Cleveland along Lake Erie, which became the largest city in the region. (The first "a" was dropped by a printer in the early years of the settlement, as Cleveland takes less space on a printed page than Cleaveland.)

In 1798 surveyors laid out the Girdled Road, indicated by girdled trees, which ran from Cleveland to the Pennsylvania state line near Lake Erie. A modern portion of Girdled Road still exists by that name.

The territory was originally named "New Connecticut" (later discarded in favor of "Western Reserve"), and settlers began to trickle in during the next few years. Youngstown was founded in 1796, Warren in 1798, Hudson and Ravenna in 1799, Ashtabula in 1803, and Stow in 1804.

Connecticut finally ceded sovereignty over the Western Reserve in 1800. The United States absorbed it into the Northwest Territory, which organized Trumbull County within the boundaries of the Reserve. Warren, Ohio is the former county seat of the Reserve and identifies itself as "the historical capital of the Western Reserve." Later, several more counties were carved out of the territory. The name "Western Reserve" survives in the area in various institutions such as the "Western Reserve Historical Society" and Case Western Reserve University in Cleveland.

The Western Reserve was arguably the most anti-slavery region of the country in the pre-Civil War period. Many Underground Railroad routes ended with a trip through the Western Reserve to a boat to cross Lake Erie into what is today Ontario. The three oldest sons of the abolitionist John Brown—John Jr., Jason, and Owen—together with other participants in John Brown's raid on Harpers Ferry, were all living in Ashtabula County, for security; the Governor of Ohio, William Denison, refused to honor Virginia's request for Owen's arrest and extradition. A U.S. Marshall, attempting to serve a warrant requiring Owen to testify before a U.S. Senate committee, reported that without "an armed force" he could not be arrested; "in Ashtabula County...there is a secret and armed organization numbering several hundred." They proclaimed themselves safer there than in any other place in the U.S., or even in Canada.

This area of Ohio became a center of resource development and industrialization through the mid-20th century. It was a center of the steel industry, receiving iron ore shipped through the Great Lakes from Minnesota, processing it into steel products, and shipping these products to the east. This industry stimulated the development of great freight lakers, as the steam ships were known, including the first steel ships in the 20th century. Railroads took over some of the freight and commodity transportation from the lake ships. In the late 19th and early 20th centuries, these cities attracted hundreds of thousands of European immigrants and migrants (both black and white) from the rural South to its industrial jobs.

Seeking Heritage Area designation
At the request of Congress in 2011, the National Park Service prepared a feasibility study for declaring the 14-county region of the Western Reserve as a National Heritage Area. This is a means to encourage broad-based preservation of such historical sites and buildings that are related to a large historical theme. Such assessment and designation has been significant for recognizing assets, and encouraging new development and businesses, including heritage tourism, often related to adaptive re-use of waterways, and buildings, as well as totally new endeavors. The United States has designated 49 National Heritage Areas, including two in Ohio: the Ohio Canal of the Ohio and Erie Canal and the National Aviation Heritage Area.

The NPS study coordinator said that while the region had the historic assets, and there was considerable public support for such a designation, the Western Reserve lacked "a definitive coordinating entity or supporting group," which is required to gain Congressional approval. If such a body develops in the future, it might seek federal designation as a Heritage Area.

Architecture
The settlers in northern Ohio repeated the style of structures and the development of towns with which they were familiar in New England; many buildings in the new settlements were designed in the Georgian, Federal, and Greek Revival styles. Towns such as Aurora, Bath, Canfield, Chagrin Falls, Gates Mills, Hudson, Medina, Milan, Norwalk, Oberlin, Painesville, Poland, and Tallmadge exemplify the expression of these styles and traditional New England town planning. For instance, Cleveland's Public Square reflects the traditional New England central town green.

See also
 Connecticut Colony
 Firelands
 Greater Cleveland
 Northeast Ohio
 Ohio Lands
 Ox-Cart Library
 Western Reserve Historical Society
 State cessions

References
Notes

Bibliography
 Hatcher, Harlan, Western Reserve: The Story of New Connecticut in Ohio, Indianapolis: The Bobbs-Merrill Company, 1949. (2nd edition, Cleveland: World Publishing, 1966). (2nd edition paperback, Kent State University Press, 1991).
 Taylor Upton, Harriet, History of the Western Reserve, New York: Lewis Publishing Co., 1910,  (1996 edition).

Further reading
Connecticut State Library (CSL) collection
The Public Records of the State of Connecticut [HistRef ConnDoc G25 1776-]. This multi-volume set contains the record of transactions of the Connecticut General Assembly. Each volume covers a given time period and has an index. Researchers interested in the Western Lands should consult these volumes to gain knowledge of the legislative actions and petitions granted by the Connecticut General Assembly.
Burke, Thomas Aquinas. Ohio Lands: A Short History. [Columbus, OH]: Auditor of State, c1997 [CSL call number HistRef HD 243 .O3 B87 1997].
Cherry, Peter Peterson. The Western Reserve and Early Ohio. Akron, OH: R. L. Fouse, 1921 [CSL call number F 495 .C52].
Fedor, Ferenz. The Yankee Migration to the Firelands. s.l.: Fedor, 1976? [CSL call number F 497 .W5 F43 1976].
Mathews, Alfred. Ohio and Her Western Reserve, With a Story of Three States Leading to the Latter, From Connecticut, by Way of Wyoming, Its Indian Wars and Massacre. New York: D. Appleton, 1902 [CSL call number F 491 .M42].
Mills, William Stowell. The Story of the Western Reserve of Connecticut. New York: Printed for the author by Brown & Wilson Press [ca. 1900] [CSL call number F 497 .W5 M6].
Peters, William E. Ohio Lands and Their Subdivision. Athens, OH: W. E. Peters, 1918 [CSL call number F 497 .W5 P47 1918].
Rice, Harvey. Pioneers of the Western Reserve. Boston: Lee and Shepard, 1883 [CSL call number: F 497 .W5 R5 1883].
Upton, Harriet Taylor. History of the Western Reserve. Chicago: Lewis Pub. Co., 1910 [CSL call number: F 497 .W5 U7]. Volume 1, online Volume 2, online
Wickham, Gertrude Van Rensselaer. Memorial to the Pioneer Women of the Western Reserve. [s.l.]: Whipporwill, [197- ] [CSL call number F 497 .W5 W63 1970z].

 Internet archive

 

Special topics

 Western Reserve Historical Society Selected Manuscripts. Volume 69-86, 78, online Volume 85, online
 

Church history

External links
The Western Reserve Heritage Feasibility Study
 Western Reserve Historical Society, Cleveland, Ohio
 Ohio Historical Society — Connecticut Western Reserve
 Research Guide to Connecticut's "Western Lands" or "Western Reserve"
Connecticut Western Reserve article on h2g2
Encyclopedia of Cleveland History
History of the Western Reserve
Early Settlers Association of the Western Reserve
Firelands Historical Society

 
History of Connecticut
Pre-statehood history of Ohio
Former regions and territories of the United States
Northwest Indian War
Regions of Ohio
History of Ohio
Ohio culture
Culture of New England
1662 establishments in the British Empire
1786 disestablishments in the United States
Geography of Connecticut
1800 disestablishments in the United States
Western Reserve, Ohio